Biathlon at the 1992 Winter Olympics consisted of six biathlon events. They were held at Les Saisies, about 40 kilometres from the host city of Albertville.  The events began on 11 February and ended on 20 February 1992. The 1992 Games were the first in which women competed in biathlon.

Russian biathlete Sergei Tarasov admitted in 2015 that the EUN (former Soviet nations competing in a unified team) biathlon team had carried out illegal blood transfusions at the Games. Something went very wrong with his transfusion, and he was rushed to the hospital where they saved his life.

Medal summary

Six nations won medals in biathlon, Germany leading the medal table  with seven (3 gold, 4 silver). The Unified Team was the only other team to win more than two medals.  Mark Kirchner led the individual medal table with two golds and three medals total, while Antje Misersky-Harvey also won three medals, one gold and two silver.

France's gold medal in the relay was the country's first medal of any type in the sport. Canada's bronze, won by Myriam Bédard, was the first medal won by an athlete from outside Europe or the former Soviet Union.

Medal table

Men's events

Women's events

Participating nations
Twenty-eight nations sent biathletes to compete in the events. Below is a list of the competing nations; in parentheses are the number of national competitors. Three former Soviet republics (Estonia, Latvia and Lithuania), made their biathlon debuts, along with Slovenia and Greece. The Unified Team also made its only appearance.

See also
Biathlon at the 1992 Winter Paralympics

References

 
1992 in biathlon
1992 Winter Olympics events
1992
Biathlon competitions in France